Maan (Urdu: مان) is a sizable village in Gujranwala Tehsil of District Gujranwala. It was founded in the 17th century by General Maan Singh, who came here from somewhere in the East of the Punjab (now in Eastern Punjab).
It has a population of about 10,000 of which the Maans are in majority. Others include Rajputs that came from India at the time of partition, Butts and others workers class people. Most of worker class people migrated to Gujranwala.

Surroundings
The village is surrounded by two historical forts, Qila Didar Singh and Qila Mian Singh.

There is one highway joining the village with Gujranwala and Hafizabad. Through this highway there is further three kilometer distance by horse carts and auto rickshaws to reach to village heart.

Facilities
The village has
 A Post Office
 Hospital
 Girls Higher Secondary School
 Boys Middle School
 Girls Middle School

Sources and income
The main source of income is agriculture. Most of the farmers cultivate Wheat in winter, Rice (Basmati rice) in summer and various vegetables in every season. Water source is just 60 feet below ground level and rich with sweet water. Village sewerage system is open channel drains going into 4 hector pound for evaporation of waste water. Farmers near pound use same waste water as fertilizing agent for crops which is enriched with urea.

References

Gujranwala District